USS North Carolina (SSN-777), a  attack submarine, is the fourth vessel of the United States Navy named for U.S. state of
North Carolina. The contract to build her was awarded to Northrop Grumman Newport News on 30 September 1998 and her keel was laid down on 24 May 2004. She was launched on 5 May 2007. North Carolina was commissioned on 3 May 2008 in Wilmington, North Carolina.

This class of submarine is unique in that it features the Photonics Mast Program (PMP) that freed ship designers to place the boat's control room in a lower, less geometrically constrained space than would be required by a standard, optical tube periscope. It is additionally unique in the U.S. Navy for featuring all-digital ship and ballast control systems that are operated by relatively senior watchstanders and a pressure chamber to deploy SEAL divers while being submerged. She is capable of diverse missions, including conventional submarine warfare, strike warfare, mining operations, and delivery of special operations personnel and equipment.

History
The contract to build her was awarded to Northrop Grumman Newport News (then called Newport News Shipbuilding & Drydock Company) in Newport News, Virginia on 30 September 1998 and her keel was laid down on 22 May 2004. She was christened on 21 April 2007 sponsored by Linda Bowman, wife of Admiral Frank L. "Skip" Bowman, former director of Naval Reactors.

The boat has physical connections to previous ships named North Carolina.

North Carolina joined the fleet on 21 February 2008, after problems with the boat's steam valve and internal piping system had forced two delays in the acceptance of the vessel. Welding issues in the internal piping system scuttled a first-planned December 2007 delivery, and the discovery of an inadequate steam valve forced a further delay from January to February 2008.

The ship's official commissioning ceremony was held on 3 May 2008, in Wilmington, North Carolina.  The submarine joined the U.S. Navy's Atlantic Fleet based in New London, Connecticut.

In 2010, North Carolina changed homeports from Naval Submarine Base New London to Naval Station Pearl Harbor. She left Groton for Pearl Harbor on 22 July 2010 and arrived at her new homeport, Joint Base Pearl Harbor–Hickam, on Monday, 15 November 2010 after her four-month transfer activities. During the transfer, the officers and crew of North Carolina conducted a series of exercises designed to test the boat's new combat systems and stealth capabilities. North Carolina is the third Virginia-class attack submarine to be homeported at Joint Base Pearl Harbor–Hickam and is assigned to Commander, Submarine Squadron 1.

Gallery

References

External links

USS North Carolina (SSN 777) U.S. Navy fact file 
USS North Carolina (SSN 777), Commander Naval Submarine Forces (U.S. Navy)
USS North Carolina (SSN 777), Commander, Submarine Group Two (U.S. Navy)
 

Virginia-class submarines
Nuclear submarines of the United States Navy
Ships built in Newport News, Virginia
2007 ships
Submarines of the United States